Lionel Brodie (28 May 1917 – 15 May 1995) was an Australian amateur tennis player who competed mainly in the 1930s and 1940s. 

He reached the quarterfinals of the Australian Championships in 1939, 1946 and 1947. He played in the Davis Cup. He also competed in doubles with good results at both state and national levels. In November 1949 Brodie and doubles partner Bert Tonkin lost to 15-year-olds Lew Hoad and Ken Rosewall in an interstate match at Kooyong (6-3, 6-4).

Brodie was ranked in the top 10 Australian players in 1939, 1940, 1945/6, 1946/7 and 1947/8.

Along with Frank Sedgman and Paul McNamee, Brodie also won the Grace Park Lawn Tennis Club championship, where the club recognises Brodie's contributions by awarding the Pennant Player of the Year the Lionel Brodie Trophy.

References

External links

Australian male tennis players
1917 births
1995 deaths
People from Euroa
Tennis people from Victoria (Australia)
20th-century Australian people